Vista Radio Ltd. (also formerly known as Vista Broadcast Group) is a Canadian radio broadcasting company. The company only owned stations in British Columbia until 2007, when it expanded outside the province by acquiring an existing station in Yellowknife, Northwest Territories and launching a new one in Grande Prairie, Alberta. It has since also expanded into Ontario, with the acquisition of Haliburton Broadcasting Group in 2012.

Vista Radio was founded by Paul Mann, Jason Mann, Margot Micallef, Barb Fairclough and Bryan Edwards in 2004.

On April 23, 2012, Vista announced a deal to acquire Haliburton Broadcasting Group, a broadcast group with 24 stations in small or mid-sized markets in Ontario, in cooperation with Westerkirk Capital. The deal was approved by the CRTC on October 19, 2012.

Stations

Alberta
 Bonnyville - CFNA-FM
 Grande Prairie - CFRI-FM
 Lloydminster - CKLM-FM
 Lethbridge - CJOC-FM, CKBD-FM
 Medicine Hat - CJLT-FM

British Columbia
 100 Mile House - CKBX
 Campbell River - CIQC-FM
 Castlegar - CKQR-FM
 Courtenay - CFCP-FM
 Cranbrook - CFSM-FM
 Creston - CKCV-FM 
 Duncan - CJSU-FM
 Gibsons - CKAY-FM
 Grand Forks - CKGF-2-FM
 Nelson - CHNV-FM
 Port Hardy - CFNI
 Powell River - CFPW-FM
 Prince George - CIRX-FM, CJCI-FM
 Quesnel - CKCQ-FM
 Smithers - CFBV
 Vanderhoof - CIRX-FM-1
 Williams Lake - CFFM-FM

Northwest Territories
 Yellowknife - CJCD-FM

Ontario
 Bancroft - CHMS-FM
 Barry's Bay - CHBY-FM
 Bolton - CJFB-FM  
 Bracebridge - CFBG-FM
 Cochrane - CHPB-FM
 Elliot Lake - CKNR-FM
 Espanola - CJJM-FM
 Haliburton - CFZN-FM
 Huntsville - CFBK-FM
 Iroquois Falls - CFIF-FM
 Kapuskasing - CKAP-FM
 Kemptville - CKVV-FM
 North Bay - CFXN-FM, CFCH-FM
 Parry Sound - CKLP-FM
 Prescott - CKPP-FM
 Stratford - CJCS-FM, CHGK-FM
 Sturgeon Falls - CFSF-FM
 Timmins - CHMT-FM

Former stations
 Caledon, Ontario - CFGM-FM
 Kelowna, British Columbia - CJUI (sold to Avenue Radio Ltd. in October 2017)
 Vanderhoof, British Columbia - CIVH (discontinued March 2018 after transmitter collapse. Programming moved to CIRX-FM-1.)
 Haldimand, Ontario - CKJN-FM (sold to Durham Radio in 2016)
 Niagara Falls, Ontario - CFLZ-FM, CJED-FM (sold to Byrnes Communications in January 2018)

References

External links
 
 History of Vista Broadcast Group Inc. - Canadian Communications Foundation

Radio broadcasting companies of Canada
Companies based in British Columbia